This is a compilation of the fifth and sixth The Desert Sessions releases. Queens of the Stone Age later performed "You Think I Ain't Worth a Dollar, But I Feel Like a Millionaire" on their Songs for the Deaf album, and "Rickshaw" has often been included in their live set. "Like a Drug" has been re-recorded and features on certain special editions of Lullabies to Paralyze. "I'm Dead" was recorded by Kyuss/Queens of the Stone Age bassist Nick Oliveri in an acoustic arrangement and retitled "Day I Die" for the Mondo Generator album A Drug Problem That Never Existed. This pair of sessions featured a wider range of musicians than previous releases, including Dwarves singer Blag Dahlia.

Track listing

Personnel
Josh Homme: Bass, Guitar, Yamaha, Vocals, Drums, Percussion & Other Stuff
Fred Drake: Drums, Percussion
Dave Catching: Piano, Guitar, Noises
Brant Bjork: Drums, Guitar, Pitter Pat
Mario Lalli: Vocals
Blag Dahlia: Vocals
Gene Trautmann: Drums, Percussion
Barrett Martin: Drums
Adam Maples: Drums
Teddy Quinn: Vocals
Tony Mason: Guitar, Bass
Nick Oliveri - Vocals

References

06A
1999 compilation albums
Man's Ruin Records compilation albums